This is the list of all FC Girondins de Bordeaux's European matches.

Overall record
Accurate as of 31 August 2018

Legend: GF = Goals For. GA = Goals Against. GD = Goal Difference.

Results

References

Europe
Bordeaux